Andrew George Sayers  (29 June 1957 – 11 October 2015) was an Australian curator and painter, who was the first director of Australia's National Portrait Gallery from 1998 to 2010, and director of the National Museum of Australia from 2010 to 2013.

Sayers was born in London, and emigrated to Australia at the age of seven, arriving in Sydney with his family in 1964. He studied fine arts at the University of Sydney, and considered becoming an academic before instead moving to Canberra in 1985 to work as a curator for the National Gallery of Australia, later becoming assistant director of collections.

In 1998, he was appointed as the inaugural director of the new National Portrait Gallery. He was awarded the Centenary Medal in 2001 for service to society and the arts, and in 2010 he was made a Member of the Order of Australia.

In 2010, he was appointed as director of the National Museum of Australia, however he left the role in 2013—three years into a five-year contract—to move to Melbourne where his wife Perry was working for the Victorian government.

In Melbourne, he resumed his love of painting, producing several portraits in his Richmond studio which he entered in competitions. His portrait of Tim Bonyhady was one of the finalists in the 2015 Archibald Prize. In May 2014, Sayers was diagnosed with pancreatic cancer, which he called "the background static of [his] life". He died in October 2015, aged 58.

References

External links
Sayers Pictures

1957 births
2015 deaths
Australian curators
Directors of museums in Australia
Australian portrait painters
Members of the Order of Australia
Recipients of the Centenary Medal
University of Sydney alumni
English emigrants to Australia
Deaths from pancreatic cancer
Deaths from cancer in Victoria (Australia)
Archibald Prize finalists